Jordy Claude Daniel Lemoine (born 14 January 1988), known as Jordy, is a French singer and musician. He was known for his hit single "Dur dur d'être bébé!" when he was four years old.

He was born in Saint-Germain-en-Laye, Yvelines. He is the son of music producer Claude Lemoine, who was involved with the Rockets from 1976 to 1992.

Career
Jordy is listed in the Guinness Book of World Records as the youngest singer ever to have a No. 1 charted single. He achieved this in 1992, at the age of four-and-a-half, with the song "Dur dur d'être bébé!" ("It's Tough to Be a Baby").

"Dur dur d'être bébé!" was No. 1 for 15 weeks in France, and was a dance hit across Europe, Brazil, Latin America, South Korea, and Japan. It landed at No. 58 on the Billboard Hot 100, making him the youngest artist to ever chart there.

As a teenager, Jordy appeared on Season 2 of the French television show La Ferme Célébrités on 30 April 2005, making his first public appearance in almost ten years. He was the show's final winner on 28 June 2005.

On 28 February 2006, he released his first new single in 12 years, "Je T'apprendrai", and began performing with his band Jordy & the Dixies.

Discography

Albums
 Pochette Surprise (1992)
 Potion Magique (1993)
 Récréation (1995)

Singles

References

External links 
 Jordy on MySpace
 Jordy's listing at BCSD
 Jordy Songs, Albums, Reviews, Bio & More

1988 births
Living people
People from Saint-Germain-en-Laye
French child singers
La Ferme Célébrités participants
21st-century French singers
21st-century French male singers